The men's 400 metre freestyle competition of the swimming events at the 1999 Pan American Games took place on 5 August at the Pan Am Pool. The last Pan American Games champion was Josh Davis of US.

This race consisted of eight lengths of the pool, with all eight being in the freestyle stroke.

Luiz Lima won the gold medal, breaking a string of 11 U.S. titles in a row. Before him, only other non-American had won the race, his compatriot Tetsuo Okamoto, in the first edition of the Games in 1951.

Results
All times are in minutes and seconds.

Heats
The first round was held on August 5.

B Final 
The B final was held on August 5.

A Final 
The A final was held on August 5.

References

Swimming at the 1999 Pan American Games